Short track speed skating at the 2014 Winter Olympics was held at the Iceberg Skating Palace in Sochi, Russia. The eight events took place between 10–21 February 2014.

Competition schedule
The following is the competition schedule for all eight events. Completed events that include the event finals are shown in bold.

All times are (UTC+4).

Medal summary

Medal table

Men's events

At 31 years and 191 days, Vladimir Grigorev became the oldest man to win a short track Olympic medal, winning silver at the 1000m event. On 21 February 2014, he won the gold in the 5000m relay, upping the oldest short track male athlete record for both medals and gold medals.

Women's events

Notes
Viktor Ahn became the first short track speedskater to win all four Olympic golds (500m, 1000m, 1500m, 5000m relay). He also became the short track speedskater with the most Olympic gold medals, with 6, winning 3 golds in 2014, and 3 in 2006 (for South Korea). With his 4 medals from 2006 and 4 from 2014, he tied Apolo Anton Ohno with the most Olympic short track medals, at 8.

Qualification

A total quota of 120 athletes were allowed to compete at the Games (60 men and 60 women). Countries were assigned quotas using a combination of the four special Olympic Qualification classification that were held at two World cups in November 2013. A nation may have entered a maximum of five athletes per gender if it had qualified a relay team and three if it does not. Hosts Russia were guaranteed the full quota of 10 athletes. For the 500m, and 1000m there were 32 qualifiers, for the 1500m 36 qualifiers, and the relay 8. The ISU released quotas on 22 November 2013.

Participating nations
A total of 116 athletes from 25 nations participated (the numbers of athletes are shown in parentheses). Two nations, Chinese Taipei and Lithuania made their Olympic debuts in the sport, while Hong Kong qualified its first male athlete at the Winter Olympics in this event.

References

External links
Official Results Book – Short Track Speed Skating

 
Short track speed skating
2014
Winter Olympics